Marvin Loback (November 21, 1896 – August 18, 1938) was an American film actor. He appeared in more than 110 films between 1916 and 1935. He was born in Tacoma, Washington and died in Los Angeles, California.

Selected filmography

 Follow the Crowd (1918)
 Kicked Out (1918)
 A Small Town Idol (1921)
 Hands Off! (1921)
 White Wings (1923)
 The Soilers (1923)
 Off His Trolley (1924) (credited as Marvin Lobach)
 Smithy (1924)
 Sock and Run (1927)
 Mitt the Prince (1927)
 The Big Shot (1927)
 Sing, Bing, Sing (1933)
 Uncivil Warriors (1935)
 Three Little Beers (1935)

External links

1896 births
1938 deaths
American male film actors
American male silent film actors
20th-century American male actors